Megachile decemsignata is a species of bee in the family Megachilidae. It was described by Radozskowski in 1881.

References

Decemsignata
Insects described in 1881